David Dickenson (born January 11, 1973) is a Canadian football head coach and general manager with the Calgary Stampeders and former professional player with the Stampeders and the BC Lions where he won the 2006 Grey Cup and was named the game's MVP. Dickenson also played quarterback collegiately at the University of Montana, where he led the Montana Grizzlies to the 1995 NCAA I-AA college football championship.

High school years
Dickenson attended Charles M. Russell High School in Great Falls, Montana, was an excellent student, and lettered in football, basketball, and golf. In football, he led his teams to two State Championships. Dickenson graduated from Charles M. Russell High School in 1991 with a 4.0 grade-point average. Dickenson's #15 jersey was soon retired by the school.

College career
Dickenson is considered by many to be the greatest quarterback ever to play for the University of Montana. He owns numerous Big Sky Conference and Montana records. By the time he graduated in 1995, Dickenson had the highest completion percentage, highest percentage of passes for a touchdown, and fewest interceptions per pass in NCAA Division I-AA history. In his college career (including playoff games), he completed 1,015 of 1,477 passes (68.7%) for 13,486 yards with 116 touchdowns and only 26 interceptions, and was responsible for 137 total touchdowns (116 passing and 21 rushing).

In 1995, Dickenson's senior season, he threw for 5,676 yards in fifteen games, including 1,500 in four playoff games. Along with leading the Montana Grizzlies to a victory in the 1995 NCAA Division I-AA Football Championship Game, Dickenson won the 1995 Walter Payton Award as the outstanding offensive player in Division I-AA.

In Montana, he is known as "Super Dave" and "The Legend of the Fall." His college jersey number, 15, was retired by the University of Montana. He is one of only two players so honored. In 1999, Dickenson was listed as the 12th best Athlete to ever come out of Montana in Sports Illustrated's 50th Anniversary Issue.   In 2004, he was voted the most popular athlete from Montana in a Sports Illustrated poll. In 2013, he was listed number one on a list of the Big Sky Conference 50 Greatest Male Athletes. In December 2018, he was to be enshrined in the College Football Hall of Fame.

Professional career

Calgary Stampeders 
Dickenson began his professional career with the CFL's Calgary Stampeders in 1997.  His best year with the Stampeders was 2000, when Dickenson led the CFL in passing efficiency (114.1) and completion percentage (64.3%). During the 2000 season, Dickenson earned Player of the Week honors once, was named a CFL All-Star, and won the CFL's Most Outstanding Player Award. He won a Grey Cup championship with Calgary in 1998.

National Football League
After generating interest from the NFL following his outstanding 2000 CFL season, Dickenson spent two seasons (2001-2002) in the National Football League. He spent the entire 2001 season as the third string QB for the San Diego Chargers, but was released by San Diego at the end of training camp in 2002 after a disappointing preseason in which he did not get to play in a game. He was then signed by the Seattle Seahawks and served as the third QB for two games before being released on September 24. In October, he signed with the Miami Dolphins following an injury to Jay Fiedler, and served as their third QB until December 3. He finished the season as the third QB for the Detroit Lions for their final two games after Joey Harrington was diagnosed with an irregular heartbeat.

BC Lions
Dickenson signed as a free agent with the BC Lions in 2003. Dickenson was named Offensive Player of the Month for August 2003, was the CFL Player of the Week in Week 5, and was awarded the Jeff Nicklin Memorial Trophy as the CFL West Division's Most Outstanding Player.

In 2004, Dickenson began the season as the Lions' starting quarterback, but gave way to backup Casey Printers after suffering a knee injury. Printers put on a dominating performance for the rest of the season, but in the West Division Final against the Saskatchewan Roughriders, was forced to leave the game with a shoulder injury in the fourth quarter, with the score tied 14-14. Dickenson, having recovered from knee surgery and shared quarterbacking duties with Printers late in the season, played the rest of the game and threw a touchdown pass in the Lions' 27-24 overtime victory. Dickenson would start and play the entire Grey Cup game against the Toronto Argonauts, which the Lions lost by a score of 27-19.

Dickenson began the 2005 season embroiled in a quarterback controversy with Printers, who was named the 2004 CFL Most Outstanding Player. Dickenson emerged as the starter, and was instrumental in leading the Lions to an 11-0 start (where he played in 9 of the 11 games), en route to a 12-6 season finish.  Dickenson set an all-time CFL record with a passing efficiency mark of 118.8. He fell just short of the attempts required to set a further mark with a 74.0% completion rate, due to 4 games missed because of a concussion. Dickenson was named CFL Player of the Month for both July and September, and was Player of the Week twice.

He led the Lions to the franchise's 5th Grey Cup title on November 19, 2006 with a 25-14 win over the Montreal Alouettes. Dickenson was named the Grey Cup Most Valuable Player. Dickenson's 2007 season was interrupted early by a serious concussion received on a hit from Saskatchewan's Fred Perry. Jarious Jackson eventually led the team to another first-place finish and franchise record 14 wins, but the Lions were defeated in the playoffs with a recovered Dickenson being called on to relieve Jackson. Dickenson was released from the BC Lions on November 26, 2007, after five seasons with the team.

Return to Calgary
On January 31, 2008, Dickenson signed as a free agent with the Calgary Stampeders, the team where he began his professional career, lives with his family, and where his brother Craig was the special-teams co-ordinator then. But this return was short lived, as post concussion symptoms returned, thus ending his long storied career in professional football.

Dickenson retired as a player on February 4, 2009.

In 2015, Dickenson was inducted into the Canadian Football Hall of Fame.

Playing statistics

Coaching career
On May 1, 2009, Dickenson made the transition from player to coach, joining the Calgary Stampeders as an offensive assistant coach.  He was responsible for coaching the running backs but was involved in other areas of the offence. On December 9, 2010, he was promoted from quarterbacks coach to offensive coordinator.

On December 3, 2014, Calgary Stampeders general manager and head coach John Hufnagel announced that he would hand over the head coaching duties to Dickenson for the 2016 season. Dickenson led the team to a franchise record for points in a season with a 15-2-1 record in 2016. The Stampeders were also unbeaten over a 16-game stretch, which was a single-season league record. He also became the first rookie head coach in the Canadian Football League to win 14 games and also had the second highest point total in league history (one behind the 1989 Edmonton Eskimos). The team also finished with a perfect 9-0 home record, which was the third such instance in team history. Because of all his success Dickenson won the Annis Stukus Trophy for coach of the year. On January 20, 2017 Dickenson and the Stampeders agreed to a 3-year contract extension through the 2020 CFL season. He won his first Grey Cup as a head coach in 2018 following the team's victory in the 106th Grey Cup game.

On December 12, 2022, it was announced that Dickenson had been named the team's general manager in addition to retaining his head coaching duties.

Head coaching record

References

External links
BC Lions Official Website - Player Profile:  Dave Dickenson #12

1973 births
Living people
American football quarterbacks
American players of Canadian football
BC Lions players
Calgary Stampeders coaches
Calgary Stampeders players
Canadian Football Hall of Fame inductees
Canadian Football League Most Outstanding Player Award winners
Canadian football quarterbacks
Montana Grizzlies football players
Sportspeople from Great Falls, Montana
Players of American football from Montana
San Diego Chargers players
Walter Payton Award winners